KDXN is a radio station based in Dickinson, North Dakota (licensed to South Heart, North Dakota), and is owned by Glassworks Broadcasting, LLC.  The station is broadcasts a broad-based adult contemporary format. The station plays a broad mix of music from the 1970s to today, within the genres of classic rock, country, alternative rock, adult contemporary and Top 40.

History
KDXN owners Totally Amped, LLC admits that getting into the business of radio was going to be a challenge, as this was an opportunity venture that was available in Dickinson, after original owners Western Edge Media, LLC went bankrupt while initially trying to start KDXN back in 2009 with a Country format.  Upon the first year of broadcasting on the air, KDXN featured mostly an adult hits format.  Critical reviews were welcomed on their Facebook fan page, and during the summer of 2011, an all request music program was introduced during the noon hour.  As of September, 2011, The Mix 105.7 features a broadened format of newer music from the country, alternative rock, hot adult contemporary and Top 40 charts as well as songs by artists from the classic rock era not normally heard on other stations. Now, as of 2022, KDXN is owned by Glassworks Broadcasting, LLC and is totally dedicated in being the station, that listeners can enjoy all of the time.

External links

DXN
Radio stations established in 2009